Frances Oman Clark (March 28, 1905 – April 17, 1998) was an American pianist, pedagogue, and academic who authored, co-authored and edited many widely used piano method books, most notably The Music Tree series. Her 1955 publication, Time to Begin, introduced the concept of teaching music reading by pattern recognition, thus pioneering the "intervallic method," which "revolutionised" the teaching of music reading.

Biography
Clark received a bachelor's degree at Kalamazoo College in 1928 and also completed graduate work at University of Michigan, The Juilliard School, The Paris Conservatory, and The American Academy at Fontainebleau. She went on to serve on the faculty at Kalamazoo College from 1945–1955, before joining the faculty of Westminster Choir College and eventually co-founding The New School for Music Study in 1960, the first graduate school devoted to the study of music pedagogy.

References

1905 births
1998 deaths
20th-century American women pianists
20th-century American pianists